"The Best of Both Worlds" is a pop-rock song performed by American singer and actress Miley Cyrus for the Disney Channel television series Hannah Montana. Cyrus performs the song as Hannah Montana, who is the alter ego of the series' protagonist Miley Stewart. It was released as the debut and lead single from the Hannah Montana soundtrack album on March 18, 2006. "The Best of Both Worlds" is the theme song of the television series; in the series' third season, the 2009 Movie Mix is used as the theme. A live version is available on Hannah Montana & Miley Cyrus: Best of Both Worlds Concert (2008), a karaoke version is included in the soundtrack's karaoke series (2008), and the 2009 Movie Mix is featured on Hannah Montana: The Movie soundtrack (2009). The song has elements of bubblegum pop and pop rock. Lyrically, it is a showcase of the double life lived by Miley Stewart.

"The Best of Both Worlds" is considered to be one of Cyrus' signature songs, introducing her to the music industry. The song received generally positive reviews; critics noted that the song was written well despite its "weird" concept. "The Best of Both Worlds" reached number 92 on the Billboard Hot 100, making the song only one of two television themes of the decade (the other being "Leave It All to Me" by Miranda Cosgrove) to chart on the Hot 100, and achieved some commercial success internationally. The song reached its highest international chart peak position on the Irish Singles Chart, at number seventeen. A promotional music video for the song was taken from a recording of a concert performance. Cyrus promoted the song by performing it at several venues, including her performances as the opening act for The Cheetah Girls' The Party's Just Begun Tour and as the closing number on her own first headlining concert tour of the same name. Cyrus' performances of the song on the Best of Both Worlds Tour were as herself, but when she performed the song on television, she did so in character as Hannah Montana.

Background

"The Best of Both Worlds" is a song with influences from dance, rock and country music, and its instrumentation features offbeat electric guitars, upbeat synths and backing vocals. It is set in common time with a tempo of 130 beats per minute. The song is written in the key of C major. Cyrus' vocals span from A3 to D5. The song begins with the chord progression C5–G5–D5–F5.

The song was written by Matthew Gerrard and Robbie Nevil. The duo wrote three other songs on the Hannah Montana soundtrack and continue writing songs for the franchise, including "Nobody's Perfect" and "Ice Cream Freeze (Let's Chill)." Lyrically, the song is one of several songs ("Just Like You", "The Other Side of Me", "Old Blue Jeans", "Ordinary Girl" and "Rock Star") that explicitly allude to Stewart's double life as Montana: regular adolescent that moved from Nashville, Tennessee to Malibu, California by day and pop star by night. In the song, Cyrus sings about the privileges and advantages that are faced in leading in two lives, with references to Orlando Bloom, concerts, friendship and film premieres.

Critical reception
The song received generally positive reviews from critics. Heather Phares of AllMusic described the song as having "sharper-than-average songwriting" and one of the best tracks from the Hannah Montana soundtrack. Chris Willman of Entertainment Weekly compared the song to the musical styles of Avril Lavigne, Ashlee Simpson and Britney Spears. However, Willman stated that the concept of "The Best of Both Worlds" was "a nice fantasy for Brangelina, but a weird one to push on little girls".

Chart performance
The song received low airplay due to it being released to Radio Disney, but not to other mainstream radio stations. The song debuted at number 64 on Billboards Hot Digital Songs Chart which led to an appearance on the Billboard Hot 100 for the week ending August 12, 2006. It debuted and peaked at number 92 on the Hot 100, and stayed on the chart for two weeks. In the same week of its entry on the Hot 100, the song charted at number seventy-one on the Pop 100 and dropped from the chart the following week.

"The Best of Both Worlds" reached higher peak chart positions in Europe. For the week ending February 22, 2007, the song debuted and peaked at number seventeen in the Irish Singles Chart, and dropped out of the chart the following week. The song debuted and peaked at number 43 on the UK Singles Chart dated Feb. 24, 2007, and spent one week on the chart. It became Cyrus's highest peaking single in the United Kingdom, when credited as Hannah Montana. In 2008 it charted in the German Singles Chart, debuting at number 71 and eventually peaking at number 66. It spent a total of seven weeks on the chart.

Live performances

Cyrus often dressed as the Hannah Montana character when she performed "The Best of Both Worlds" at concerts and promotional television appearances. At the concert taping to promote the first season of Hannah Montana, Cyrus dressed in boots, jeans, a pink-sequinned blouse, khaki jacket, and blonde wig, to perform "The Best of Both Worlds" and five other songs. She also performed complex choreography and acted out several of the song's lyrics with the background dancers. This performance premiered on Disney Channel as the promotional video for the song and the television series on March 3, 2006. On June 23, 2006, Cyrus performed the song at Disney's Typhoon Lagoon. Cyrus performed the song on twenty dates when she opened for The Cheetah Girls' 2006 concert tour The Party's Just Begun Tour.<ref>{{cite press release|url=http://www.highbeam.com/doc/1G1-148743330.html|archive-url=https://web.archive.org/web/20110511205904/http://www.highbeam.com/doc/1G1-148743330.html|url-status=dead|archive-date=May 11, 2011|publisher=Walt Disney Records|access-date=October 5, 2009|title=Multi-Platinum Recording Artists The Cheetah Girls Launch 40-City Nationwide Concert Tour; ;;Hannah Montana's Miley Cyrus and High School Musical's Vanessa Anne Hudgens Slotted as Special Guests in Selected Cities.}}</ref> On October 23, 2006, she performed it on Good Morning America, and she performed it again the following day on Live with Regis and Kelly. The following month she performed it at the 2006 Macy's Thanksgiving Day Parade.

On March 28, 2007, Cyrus appeared as Hannah Montana and performed the song for Hannah Montana: Live in London at Koko. The event was televised on several international Disney Channels. On December 20, 2007, Cyrus performed the song as herself on The Oprah Winfrey Show. "The Best of Both Worlds" was later performed as the closing number on Cyrus' first headlining Best of Both Worlds Tour. She performed the song as herself, wearing an all-pink outfit composed of a tank top, plaid mini-skirt, sneakers, and a jacket. She most recently performed "The Best of Both Worlds: The 2009 Movie Mix", from the Hannah Montana: The Movie'' soundtrack, with eight other songs, at the concert taping for the third season of Hannah Montana; the concert was held on October 10 in Irvine, California at the Verizon Wireless Amphitheatre.

Track listings

 US/EU Digital Single
 "The Best of Both Worlds" - 2:54
 US/EU CD Single
 "The Best of Both Worlds" - 2:54
 "If We Were a Movie" - 3:03

 FR CD Single
 "Le Meilleur des Deux" (French Version by Sarah) - 2:54
 "The Best of Both Worlds" (Instrumental) - 2:54
 "The Best of Both Worlds" (Original Version) - 2:54
 UK EP Digital Download
 "The Best of Both Worlds" - 2:54
 "If We Were a Movie" - 3:03
 "The Best of Both Worlds" (Daniel Canary Remix) - 2:36

Charts

Certification

References

External links

2006 singles
Hannah Montana songs
Songs written by Matthew Gerrard
Songs written by Robbie Nevil
Songs from television series
Television theme songs
Song recordings produced by Matthew Gerrard
2006 songs
Walt Disney Records singles